Calliandra conferta is a species of flowering plants of the genus Calliandra in the family Fabaceae.

References

External links
Germplasm Resources Information Network: Calliandra 
United States Department of Agriculture 

conferta
Taxa named by George Bentham